Lean on Me is an album by organist Shirley Scott recorded in 1972 and released on the Cadet label.

Track listing 
All compositions by Shirley Scott except as indicated
 "Lean On Me" (Bill Withers) - 4:50   
 "Royal Love" - 5:10    
 "Smile" (Charlie Chaplin, Geoffrey Parsons, John Turner) - 5:34  
 "Funky Blues" - 8:33 
 "By The Time I Get To Phoenix" (Jimmy Webb) - 8:29   
 "How Insensitive" (Antônio Carlos Jobim, Norman Gimbel) - 8:54
 "You Can't Mess Around With Love" - 5:54    
 "Carla's Dance" - 5:08

Personnel 
 Shirley Scott - organ
 J. Daniel Turner - flute, alto saxophone
 George Coleman - tenor saxophone
 Roland Prince - guitar
 Idris Muhammad - drums

References 

1972 albums
Albums produced by Esmond Edwards
Cadet Records albums
Shirley Scott albums